Niels Knudsen Petersen (12 July 1885 – 29 April 1961) was a Danish gymnast who competed in the 1906 Intercalated Games, the 1908 Summer Olympics, and the 1912 Summer Olympics.

At the 1906 Intercalated Games in Athens, he was a member of the Danish gymnastics team, which won the silver medal. He was part of the Danish team, which finished fourth in the gymnastics team event in 1908.

Four years later he won the bronze medal in the gymnastics men's team, free system event. In the individual all-around competition he finished 34th.

References

External links
 

1885 births
1961 deaths
Danish male artistic gymnasts
Olympic gymnasts of Denmark
Olympic silver medalists for Denmark
Olympic bronze medalists for Denmark
Olympic medalists in gymnastics
Medalists at the 1906 Intercalated Games
Medalists at the 1912 Summer Olympics
Gymnasts at the 1906 Intercalated Games
Gymnasts at the 1908 Summer Olympics
Gymnasts at the 1912 Summer Olympics